Vossabrygg is an album by guitarist Terje Rypdal recorded in 2003 and released on the ECM label.

Reception
The Allmusic review by Thom Jurek awarded the album 4 stars stating "Vossabrygg is the latest adventure in a stunning, unraveling labyrinth, created by a master explorer".

Track listing
 Ghostdancing (18:31)
 Hidden Chapter (5:39 )
 Waltz for Broken Hearts/Makes You Wonder (10:06)
 Incognito Traveller (4:04 )
 Key Witness (1:36)
 That's More Like It (10:07)
 De Slagferdige (2:38)
 Jungeltelegrafen (2:39)
 You're Making It Personal (8:54)
 A Quiet Word (3:46)

Personnel
Terje Rypdal — electric guitar
Palle Mikkelborg — trumpet, synthesizer
Bugge Wesseltoft — electric piano, synthesizer
Ståle Storløkken — Hammond organ, electric piano, synthesizer
Marius Rypdal — electronics, samples, turntables
Bjørn Kjellemyr — electric bass, double bass
Jon Christensen — drums
Paolo Vinaccia — percussion

Notes 
All compositions by Terje Rypdal
Recorded at the Vossa Jazz Festival in Norway on April 12, 2003

References 

ECM Records live albums
Terje Rypdal albums
2007 albums
Albums produced by Manfred Eicher